The Duclair duck is a dual purpose duck breed named after the town of Duclair in Normandy. It is a type of Rouen duck and is also described as being similar to the Swedish Blue. Official standards were established for the Duclair on November 23, 1923.

Duclair ducks are considered excellent for roast duck. It has been described as "tasting like a cross between veal and lamb" by Alain Ducasse and Daniel Boulud, and as "gamy".

Physical appearance
There are two color varieties; a black and a blue. Both have a single white feather on each wing and a white bib. Eggs have a blue-green shell. Duclair ducks are very handsome.

Eggs 
Duclair ducks are known to lay up to 80 - 100 eggs per year. It takes a minimum of 26 to 28 days for these duckling eggs to hatch. Duclair duck eggs are noted due to their size and numerous health benefits. The eggs are significantly larger than a chicken egg and carry double the amount of Vitamin A and six times the amount of Vitamin D. Duclair ducklings can take up to 8 weeks to learn to fly and are strong and stable in their youth. They do not often perish by  disease and can adapt easily to differing climates.

Diet 
Duclair ducks live off a simple diet of a variety of insects and crustaceans. They consume flies, beetles, worms, and dragonflies. The duclair duck is an excellent forager and are able to fend for themselves in the wild.

Raising Duclair ducks 
Duclair ducks are considered to be a very tame and very calm duck. This makes the Duclair duck a very good choice for a beginner pet. According to Kim Irvine of domestic animal breeds, this is the best breed of ducklings you can get as a first time owner of ducklings. They roam freely and also take care of themselves. Another plus is that the Duclair duck does not have any known diseases, so worrying about catching a disease from a duck or the other potential animals you take in as a pet.

Culinary Influence 
Duclair ducks are most widely known in the culinary world for their meat and egg production. They are attractive to chefs and consumers due to their rapid growth rate. A duclair duck is smaller than an average duck, but due to its affinity to disease and excellent taste, it is a highly sought after meat that is mainly served in high-scale restaurants. Despite being low maintenance pets, a majority of Duclair ducks are bred to produce meat.

Unique Features 
Duclair Ducks have three eyelids with the third found on the side of the eye. The third eyelid is called the nictitating membrane. The Duclair duck, whether it is flying or swimming underwater, has superior vision to other species of ducks. In fact, whenever Duclair ducks swim underwater/fly, they blink their eyelids. When blinking their eyelids, it acts as a windshield wiper to clear their eyes, which then helps them when diving underwater, and also helps when drying out eyes when flying.

References 

Duck breeds originating in France